ICFAI University, Jharkhand, or in its full name Institute of Chartered Financial Analysts of India University, Jharkhand, is a private university located in Ranchi, Jharkhand, India.

See also
Education in India
List of private universities in India
List of institutions of higher education in Jharkhand

References

External links

Private universities in India
2008 establishments in Jharkhand
Universities in Jharkhand